The NCAA soft tennis championship is a demonstration sport that was introduced in its 2009-10 season. This is exclusive to women.

Champions

Number of championships by school

See also
UAAP Soft Tennis Championship

External links
Champions list at the official NCAA Philippines website

Soft Tennis